László Szőcs (born 10 October 1984) is a Romanian futsal player of Hungarian ethnicity, who plays for Futsal Klub Székelyudvarhely and the Romanian national futsal team.

References

External links
profile

1984 births
Living people
Romanian men's futsal players
Romanian sportspeople of Hungarian descent